Rajendra Shah may refer to:

Rajendra Shah (author) (28 January 1913 – 2 January 2010) was a lyrical poet who wrote in Gujarati.
Rajendra Shah (cricketer) (1950 – 28 September 2018) was an Indian cricketer.